The  1940 German football championship, the 33rd edition of the competition, was won by Schalke 04, the club's fifth German championship, by defeating Dresdner SC 1–0 in the final. Both clubs would continue to be strong sides during the Second World War editions of the German championship with Schalke making a losing appearance in the 1941 final before winning again in 1942 while Dresden was crowned German champions in 1943 and 1944.

Schalke's 16–0 win over CSC 03 Kassel in the group stages was the highest win in the history of the German championship as well as the most goals scored in a game.

Rapid Wien's Franz Binder became the 1940 championships top scorer with 14 goals, a new record that would be broken the following year by Schalke's Hermann Eppenhoff when he scored 15 goals.

The eighteen 1939–40 Gauliga champions, the same number as in 1939, competed in a group stage with the four group winners advancing to the semi-finals. The two semi-final winners then contested the 1940 championship final. The groups were divided into three with four clubs and one with six clubs with the latter, in turn, subdivided into two groups of three teams each and a final of these group winners to determine the overall group champions.

In the following season, the German championship was played with twenty clubs. From there it gradually expanded further through a combination of territorial expansion of Nazi Germany and the sub-dividing of the Gauligas in later years, reaching a strength of thirty-one in its last completed season, 1943–44.

Qualified teams
The teams qualified through the 1939–40 Gauliga season:

Competition

Group 1

Group 1A
Group 1A was contested by the champions of the Gauligas Brandenburg, Ostpreußen and Pommern:

Group 1B
Group 1B was contested by the champions of the Gauligas Ostmark, Schlesien and Sudetenland:

Group 1 final

|}

Group 2
Group 2 was contested by the champions of the Gauligas Mitte, Niedersachsen, Nordmark and Sachsen:

Group 3
Group 3 was contested by the champions of the Gauligas Hessen, Mittelrhein, Niederrhein and Westfalen:

Group 4
Group 4 was contested by the champions of the Gauligas Bayern, Baden, Südwest and Württemberg:

Semi-finals
Two of the four clubs in the 1940 semi-finals had reached the same stage in the previous season, Dresdner SC and FC Schalke 04, while Rapid Wien replaced Admira Wien and SV Waldhof Mannheim Hamburger SV in comparison to 1939:

|align="center" style="background:#ddffdd" colspan=3|14 July 1940

|}

Third place play-off

|align="center" style="background:#ddffdd" colspan=3|21 July 1940

|}

Replay

|align="center" style="background:#ddffdd" colspan=3|28 July 1940

|}

Final

References

Sources
 kicker Allmanach 1990, by kicker, page 164 & 177 - German championship

External links
 German Championship 1939–40 at weltfussball.de 
 German Championship 1940 at RSSSF

1
German
German football championship seasons